is a district of Kōtō, Tokyo, Japan. Ariake is to the west of it, and it is joined to Toyosu to the north by a bridge, and Tatsumi to the east by several bridges. Its subdivisions consist of Shinonome 1, 2, 3, 4, 5, 6, 7, 8, 9, 10, 11, 12, 13 and 14 chome. Located south of Toyosu, it is largely a residential area, with many apartments and condominiums.

History

Transportation
 Shinonome Station (Rinkai Line)

Companies
 Tokyo Electric Power Services Co. Ltd

Public facilities
 Shinonome Grancha
 Shinonome Mizube Park
 Shinonome Public Library

Residences
 Apple Tower
 Beacon Tower
 Branz Shinonome
 Canal Court Codan
 Comfort Towers
 Canal First Tower
 Park Tower
 Proud Tower
 Shinonome Number Two Apartment Building
 Tomin Tower

Education
Koto Ward Board of Education operates public elementary and junior high schools.

Shinonome Elementary School (東雲小学校) is the zoned public elementary school for parts of Shinonome. Daini (No. 2) Tatsumi Primary School (第二辰巳小学校) is the zoned public elementary school for a few other parts of Shinonome. Ariake Elementary School (有明小学校) is the zoned public elementary school for one block of Shinonome.

Most of Shinonome is zoned to Ariake Junior High School (有明中学校) while some residences are zoned to Tatsumi Junior High School (辰巳中学校).

References

External links

 Kōtō Ward official website 

Districts of Kōtō
Artificial islands of Tokyo